Kanjavec is a  mountain in the center of Triglav National Park. It lies between the Dolič Pass at 2,164 m, the Hribarice Pass at 2,306 m and the Prehodavci Pass at 2071 m. Kanjavec is also a popular ski touring destination. From the summit, there is a panoramic view of the surrounding mountains. It is relatively easy to ascend, with a few exposed areas.

Starting points
 Zadnjica (609 m)
 Blato Mountain Pasture (1,147 m)
 Savica Lodge (653 m)

Routes
 6¼ hrs from Zadnjica, over the Prehodavci Pass
 6 hrs from Zadnjica, via the Dolič Pass
 6 hrs Koča pri Savici (1,542 m) via the Triglav Lakes Valley
 6¼ hrs from Blato Mountain Pasture via Mišelj Peak
 5¾ hrs from Blato Mountain Pasture via Za Kopico  
 6 hrs from Blato Mountain Pasture over the Krstenica Mountain Pasture

References

External links

 Kanjavec
 Kanjavec on hribi.net

Mountains of the Julian Alps
Triglav National Park
Two-thousanders of Slovenia